HSS may refer to:

Organizations
 Croatian Chess Federation (Croatian: Hrvatski šahovski savez, HŠS)
 Croatian Peasant Party (Croatian: Hrvatska seljačka stranka)
 Hampstead Scientific Society, UK
 Helsingfors Segelsällskap, a Finnish yacht club
 Hindu Swayamsevak Sangh, a cultural organisation in several countries
 History of Science Society
 Humanist Society Scotland
 Hungarian Skeptic Society
 HSS Hire, a British equipment and tool hire business
 Hospital for Special Surgery, New York City

Schools
 Henderson Secondary School, Singapore
 Humbergrove Secondary School, Toronto, Ontario, Canada

Technology
 High-speed steel, a subset of tool steels
 Home Subscriber Server, a mobile subscriber database, part of the IMS framework 
 Hollow structural section, a type of metal profile

Other uses
 Humanities and Social Sciences (HSS)
 HSS Journal (Musculoskeletal Journal of Hospital for Special Surgery), a medical journal
 ERA HSS, a racing car
 Harsusi language (ISO 639-3 code), spoken in Oman
 Health systems strengthening, to improve the health care system of a country
 High-speed Sea Service, a former class of ferry
 Hisar Airport (IATA code), India

See also
 Holy Spirit School (disambiguation)